Mia Elizabeth Wright Rogers (born 29 January 2002) is an English cricketer who currently plays for Berkshire and Sunrisers. She plays as a wicket-keeper and right-handed batter. She has also represented England at lacrosse at age-group level.

Early life
Rogers was born on 29 January 2002 in Buckinghamshire.

Domestic career
Rogers made her county debut in 2017, for Berkshire against Kent.  She helped her side to winning Division 3A in the 2019 Women's Twenty20 Cup, scoring 25 runs and making 2 stumpings. She scored 63 runs for the side in the 2021 Women's Twenty20 Cup, including her Twenty20 high score of 30. In June 2021 it was announced that Rogers had joined Kent on loan for the remainder of the Women's London Championship, playing two matches for the side. In 2022, she was Berkshire's leading run-scorer in the Twenty20 Cup, scoring 174 runs including her maiden Twenty20 half-century, 50* from 35 deliveries against Shropshire.

In 2020, Rogers played for Sunrisers in the Rachael Heyhoe Flint Trophy. She appeared in one match, scoring 10 runs against Western Storm. In 2021, she played eight matches for the side across the Rachael Heyhoe Flint Trophy and the Charlotte Edwards Cup, scoring 31 runs. She played eleven matches for Sunrisers in 2022, across the Charlotte Edwards Cup and the Rachael Heyhoe Flint Trophy, scoring 58 runs.

References

External links

2002 births
Living people
Berkshire women cricketers
Cricketers from Buckinghamshire
Kent women cricketers
Sunrisers women's cricketers